Pahnab Mahalleh (also Romanized as Pahnāb Maḩalleh; also known as Pahnāb) is a village in Siyahrud Rural District, in the Central District of Juybar County, Mazandaran Province, Iran. At the 2006 census, its population was 610, in 177 families.

References 

Populated places in Juybar County